The 1984 Deutsche Produktionswagen Meisterschaft was the inaugural season of premier German touring car racing, which would later become the Deutsche Tourenwagen Meisterschaft.

The championship was run under modified Group A regulations, which was won by Volker Strycek driving a BMW 635CSi. Strycek won the championship despite not winning a single race.

References

Deutsche Tourenwagen Masters seasons
1984 in German motorsport